Volgograd State University (VolSU) is a public university and one of the leading institutions of higher education in Volgograd, Russia.

History

The first year enrollment (250 people) was made in 1980 and offered only 5 majors: Mathematics, Physics, History, Philology, and Linguistics on the sole at the Faculty of Sciences and Humanities. Today, the structure of the university includes Volzhsky Humanitarian Institute and five campuses in the cities of Volgograd Region: Kalach-na-Donu, Uryupinsk, Mikhaylovka, Frolovo and Akhtubinsk (Astrakhan Oblast).

Academics
VolSU has 48 faculties and research centers, 22 four-year bachelor degrees, 11 two-year master's degrees, 42 kandidat nauk (Candidate of science, equals PhD) postgraduate degrees,  and 9 doktor nauk (Doctor of science) degrees.

The university is constantly attended by more than 14 thousand students and postgraduates. There is a system of additional vocational training, which implements the President's Management Training Program of Russia and retraining programs, dual degree, professional training. Established partnerships with the Moscow State University, St. Petersburg State University, University of Cologne, University of Sorbonne, InHolland University (Netherlands) and other higher educational institutions of Russia, Europe and America. 

VolSU is a Member of the Eurasian Association of Universities Eurasia, the Association of Classic Universities of Russia, the International Association of Teachers of Russian Language and Literature; Regional Centre for Science, Education and Culture.

Faculties and departments

 History, International Relations and Social Technologies
 Department of Archeology and Foreign History
 Department of History of Russia
 Department of International Relations, Area Studies and Political Science
 Department of Sociology
 Department of Psychology
 Department of Political Science
 Department of Social Work and Pedagogics
 Mathematics and Information Technology
 Department of Mathematical Analysis and Function Theory
 Department of Fundamental Informatics and optimal control
 Department of Computer Science and Experimental Mathematics
 Department of Information Systems and Computer Modeling
 Department of Laser Physics
 Department of Radiophysics
 Department of Theoretical Physics and Wave Processes
 Priority Technologies
 Department of Forensic and physical material
 Department of Telecommunication Systems
 Department of Information Security
 Philology and Intercultural Communication
 Department of Literature, publishing and literary
 Department of Russian Language
 Department of Journalism
 Department of Linguistics and bond of Document
 Department of English Philology
 Department of Professional foreign language communication
 Department of Romance Philology
 Department of German Philology
 Department of Theory and Practice of Translation
 Economy and Finance
 Department of Corporate Finance and Banking
 Department of Theory of finance, credit and taxation
 Department of Global and Regional Economics
 Department of Accounting, Analysis and Audit
 Department of Economic Theory and Economic Policy
 Office and the Regional Economy
 Department of Marketing
 Department of Mathematical Methods and Computer Science in Economics
 Department of Management
 Department of State and Municipal Management
 Department of Economic Informatics and Management
 Law
 Department of Civil Law and Procedure
 Department of Theory of State and Law
 Department of Criminal Law
 Chair of the criminal process and criminology
 Department of International Law and Human Rights
 Department of Philosophy
 Natural Sciences
  Department of Biology
  Department of Ecology and Nature Resources Management
  Department of Geography and Cartography
 Continuing Education
 Department of Physical Education and Health Technologies

Ranking
In 2015 VolSU was ranked among the best 150 schools of developing Europe and Central Asia according to Quacquarelli Symonds 
. In 2015 VolSU was ranked among top-20 best schools of Russia in the category "economics and management".

See also
Russian educational system
Volgograd

References 

 
 

Universities and institutes established in the Soviet Union
Educational institutions established in 1980
Universities in Volgograd Oblast
Buildings and structures in Volgograd
1980 establishments in the Soviet Union